Frank J. McGinn  (1869 – November 19, 1897) was a Major League Baseball outfielder. He played  for the  Pittsburgh Alleghenys of the National League during the 1890 season.

Sources

Major League Baseball outfielders
Pittsburgh Alleghenys players
Baseball players from Ohio
1869 births
1897 deaths
19th-century baseball players